Clement Township is one of fifteen townships in Clinton County, Illinois, USA.  As of the 2010 census, its population was 475 and it contained 201 housing units.  Clement Township was formed from Carlyle Township.

Geography

Cities, towns, villages
 Huey

Cemeteries
The township contains these three cemeteries: Collins, Gerdes and Matsler.

Major highways
  US Route 50

Landmarks
 Eldon Hazlet State Recreation Area (southeast edge)
 South Shore State Park

Demographics

School districts
 Carlyle Community Unit School District 1

Political districts
 Illinois' 19th congressional district
 State House District 107
 State Senate District 54

References
 
 United States Census Bureau 2007 TIGER/Line Shapefiles
 United States National Atlas

External links
 City-Data.com
 Illinois State Archives

Townships in Clinton County, Illinois
Townships in Illinois